Frederick James Kennett (17 April 1908 – 24 August 1984) was an  Australian rules footballer who played with South Melbourne in the Victorian Football League (VFL).

Family
The son of Frederick John Kennett (1880-1969), and Margaret Isabella Kennett (1885-1933), née McLellan, Frederick James Kennett was born at Brunswick, Victoria on 17 April 1908.

He married Mary Kathleen Dee (1907-1966) in 1931.

Football
Kennett was granted a clearance from the Brunswick Football Club in the VFA to the South Melbourne Football Club in the VFL on 18 April 1928. He was granted a clearance from South Melbourne back to Brunswick on 23 May 1929. He was granted a clearance from Brunswick to the Fairfield Football Club, in the Sub-District Football League, on 13 June 1934.

Death
He died (suddenly) at Strathmore, Victoria on 24 August 1984.

Notes

References
 
 World War Two Nominal Roll: Corporal Frederick James Kennett (V311406), Department of Veterans' Affairs.
 A13860, V311406: World War Two Service Record: Corporal Frederick James Kennett (V311406), National Archives of Australia.
 B884, V311406: World War Two Service Record: Corporal Frederick James Kennett (V311406), National Archives of Australia.

External links 
 
 
 Fred Kennett, at The VFA Project.

1908 births
1984 deaths
Australian rules footballers from Victoria (Australia)
Sydney Swans players
Brunswick Football Club players
Australian Army personnel of World War II
Australian Army soldiers